Palaquium hispidum is a tree in the family Sapotaceae. The specific epithet hispidum means "coarsely hairy, bristly", referring to the species' twigs, buds, leaves and inflorescences which have such hair.

Description
The bark is greyish white. Inflorescences bear up to eight flowers.

Distribution and habitat
Palaquium hispidum is native to Sumatra, Peninsular Malaysia and Borneo. Its habitat is lowland mixed dipterocarp forests.

Conservation
Palaquium hispidum has been assessed as vulnerable on the IUCN Red List. The species is threatened by logging and conversion of forest land to palm oil plantations.

References

hispidum
Trees of Sumatra
Trees of Peninsular Malaysia
Trees of Borneo
Plants described in 1925